Ezio Cini (12 May 1945 – 1 November 2021) was an Italian sports shooter. He competed in the men's 50 metre running target event at the 1984 Summer Olympics.

References

1945 births
2021 deaths
Italian male sport shooters
Olympic shooters of Italy
Shooters at the 1984 Summer Olympics
Sportspeople from Pisa